Svesa is an urban-type settlement in Shostka Raion of Sumy Oblast, Ukraine. Population:

History 
It was a village in Glukhovsky Uyezd in Chernigov Governorate of the Russian Empire.

Urban-type settlement since 1938.

During World War II, it was occupied by the Axis troops from October 1941 to August 1943.

In 1954, there were two factories, a forestry farm, two secondary schools, a vocational school and a club. Since 1963, a technical school has been here.

In January 1989 the population was 8890 people.

In January 2013 the population was 6907 people.

References

Urban-type settlements in Shostka Raion
Glukhovsky Uyezd